Pennsylvania Route 949 (PA 949) is a , north–south state highway located in Jefferson and Elk counties in Pennsylvania.  The southern terminus is at PA 28 in Summerville.  The northern terminus is at PA 948 in Ridgway.

Route description

PA 949 begins in the borough of Summerville at the intersection of PA 28.  The route goes north to US 322, where a small concurrency occurs in the borough of Corsica.  Outside of Corsica, there is an interchange with I-80 (Exit 73).  The route continues north to the village of Sigel, where there is an intersection with PA 36.  The route then makes a northeast turn to the Clarion River, where it parallels the river going east for a short distance, then turns away from the river at the Clear Creek State Forest and Heath Pump Station, where it continues east.  The intersection with the former PA 968 is in the State Forest.

PA 949 goes on a northeast course before paralleling the Clarion River again for the rest of the route into the borough of Ridgway.  It enters the town from the southwest, and terminates in the center of the borough, at an intersection with PA 948.

History
The route was signed in 1928.  In the 1930s, the route was fully completed as was intended.  The route has stayed on the same route for most of its existence, however, it was recently extended from its former southern terminus in Corsica, to its current terminus in Summerville.

Major intersections

See also

References

External links

Pennsylvania Highways: PA 949

949
Transportation in Jefferson County, Pennsylvania
Transportation in Elk County, Pennsylvania